Herbert Wenz (born 24 June 1928) is a retired German football manager.

References

1928 births
Living people
German football managers
SV Röchling Völklingen managers
FC 08 Homburg managers
2. Bundesliga managers